Yacine Hima (born March 25, 1984 in Lyon, France) is an Algerian footballer. He currently plays for French team Lyon-Duchère.

Club career
In February 2011, after cancelling his contract with Eupen, Hima joined Neftchi Baku in the Azerbaijan Premier League. On August 5, 2011, Hima joined ES Sétif. However, he was released from the club two weeks later after failing to convince the coaching staff during pre-season training. After a year without a permanent club, Hima signed a three-year contract with FC Wil in June 2012.
In February 2013, Hima moved on again, this time to CFA side Monts d'Or Azergues, and 6 months later he moved on to Lyon-Duchère.

Career statistics

International career
On August 7, 2006, Hima was called up for the first time to the Algerian National Team by Jean-Michel Cavalli for a pair of friendlies against FC Istres and Gabon. On August 15, 2006, he made his debut as a starter in the friendly against Istres, scoring a goal in the 15th minute. The following day, he made his official debut as a starter in the friendly against Gabon. In November, Hima received his second cap as a 77th-minute substitute in a friendly against Burkina Faso.

References

External links
 
 
 AC Bellinzona profile 

1984 births
Living people
Algerian footballers
Algeria international footballers
Algerian expatriate sportspeople in Belgium
Algerian expatriate sportspeople in Saudi Arabia
Algerian expatriate sportspeople in Switzerland
LB Châteauroux players
Footballers from Lyon
French sportspeople of Algerian descent
FC Aarau players
AC Bellinzona players
Al-Watani Club players
K.A.S. Eupen players
FC Wil players
Expatriate footballers in Azerbaijan
Expatriate footballers in Belgium
Expatriate footballers in Saudi Arabia
Expatriate footballers in Switzerland
Ligue 2 players
Swiss Super League players
Belgian Pro League players
Lyon La Duchère players
GOAL FC players
Association football midfielders
Saudi Professional League players